A bastard (also historically called whoreson, although both of these terms have largely dropped from common usage) in the law of England and Wales is an illegitimate child, that is, one whose parents were not married at the time of his or her birth. Unlike in many other systems of law, there was previously no possibility of post factum legitimisation of a bastard. This situation was changed in 1926.

Etymology
The word bastard is from the Old French , which in turn was from Medieval Latin . In the modern French , the circumflex (â) merely represents the loss of the 's' over time. According to some sources,  may have come from the word , which means pack saddle,  the connection possibly being the idea that a bastard might be the child of a passing traveller (who would have a pack saddle). In support of this is the Old French phrase  loosely meaning "child of the saddle," which had a similar meaning. This meant that for two days, they had unfettered access to all of the women in town, and were therefore the ones most likely to be the cause of the town's illegitimate offspring. (This explanation is apocryphal, but no attempt at dispute seems to have been proffered.)

Another suggestion is that a group of travelling muleteers arrived, unloaded their mules, and took their pack saddles indoors and used them as bedding to sleep on.

Common law origin
Bastardy was not a status, like villeinage, but the fact of being a bastard had a number of legal effects on an individual. 
One exception to the general principle that a bastard could not inherit occurred when the eldest son (who would otherwise be heir) was born a bastard but the second son was born after the parents were married.

The Provisions of Merton 1235 (20 Hen. 3 c. IX), otherwise known as the Special Bastardy Act 1235, provided that except in the case of real actions the fact of bastardy could be proved by trial by jury, rather than necessitating a bishop's certificate.

Reform
Post-hoc legitimisation was introduced under the Legitimacy Act 1926 (16 & 17 Geo. 5 c. 60) and the Family Law Reform Act 1969 (c. 46) allowed a bastard to inherit on the intestacy of his parents.

In Medieval Wales

In Medieval Wales, prior to its conquest by and incorporation in England, a "bastard" was defined solely as a child not acknowledged by his father. All children acknowledged by a father, whether born in or out of wedlock, had equal legal rights including the right to share in the father's inheritance. This legal difference between Wales and England is often referred to in the well-known "Brother Cadfael" series of Medieval detective mysteries.

See also
 Colonial American bastardy laws
 Illegitimacy
 Legitimacy law in England and Wales

Notes

References
 William Blackstone, Commentaries on the Laws of England, York City, Legal Publish Press, 1960.
Given-Wilson C. & Curteis A., The Royal Bastards of Medieval England, London, 1984

External links
 http://www.duhaime.org/LegalDictionary/B/Bastard.aspx

English family law
Legitimacy law
Children's rights in England
Children's rights in Wales
Family law legal terminology